Ben Newton,  (born 14 February 1988)  is a wheelchair rugby player. He was selected to represent Australia at the 2012 Summer Paralympics in wheelchair rugby.

Personal life
Benaiah Thomas Newton was born on 14 February 1988 in Sydney, New South Wales. When he was two and a half years old, he was in a car accident that left him an incomplete quadriplegic. He attended Tyalla Public School and Orara High School, and in 2010 graduated from Southern Cross University with a Bachelor of Psychology with Honours (1st class). During that year, he moved to Brisbane. He was working towards earning a Certificate III and IV in Fitness in 2012, after already having become a qualified psychologist. , he was also working as a DDA Community Engagement Officer for Queensland Rail.

Wheelchair rugby

Newton is a 2.5/3.0-point wheelchair rugby player.

Newton started playing wheelchair rugby in 2004 while he was living in Coffs Harbour after having spent time watching the state representative team compete. Following the 2010 Queensland Wheelchair Rugby State Championships, he was named the competitions most valuable player. In 2010, he was a member of Gold Coast Wheelchair Rugby Titans in the National Wheelchair Rugby League.  That season, he was named to the league's All Star Four.  He captained the Titans in the 2012 season. He again captained the Suncorp QLD Cyclones in 2013, leading them to their second consecutive Sporting Wheelies and Disabled Association's "Team of the Year" honour.

Newton was first named to the national team in 2010, and made his debut in 2011.  As a member of that 2011 team, he played in the GB Cup and Asia Oceania Wheelchair Rugby Championships where his team went undefeated.  His team made the finals and qualified for the 2012 Summer Paralympics after defeating the Korea national wheelchair rugby team 63–37. In May 2012, he participated in a test series against Japan in Sydney. He participated in a London Test event, where his team defeated the Great Britain national wheelchair rugby team in the finals after having lost to Great Britain in a pool play earlier in the day. He was selected to represent Australia at the 2012 Summer Paralympics in wheelchair rugby.  Going into London, his team is ranked second in the world behind the United States. He was part of the team that won the gold medal. The Australian team went through the five-day tournament undefeated.

He was awarded an Order of Australia Medal  in the 2014 Australia Day Honours "for service to sport as a Gold Medallist at the London 2012 Paralympic Games."

References

Paralympic wheelchair rugby players of Australia
Wheelchair rugby players at the 2012 Summer Paralympics
Paralympic gold medalists for Australia
1988 births
Living people
Recipients of the Medal of the Order of Australia
Medalists at the 2012 Summer Paralympics
Southern Cross University alumni
Paralympic medalists in wheelchair rugby